"Open Letter (To a Landlord)" is a power ballad by Living Colour from their 1988 debut album Vivid. The song reached No. 82 on the Billboard Hot 100.

Critical reception
Malu Halasa, reviewer of British music newspaper Record Mirror, called Vernon Reid a "reputed virtuoso in the axe licks department" and described "Open Letter" as "practically atonal with not a pop melody in sight". Ian Gittins of Melody Maker expressed similar opinion on the single. As per him, "Living Colour also deserve far more applause than they've often had in these pages". But a critic thought that the musicians were too straight and wished for them to "have some more fun".

Track listings
 7" single
 "Open Letter (To a Landlord)" — 5:30
 "Cult of Personality" (Live) — 5:06

 12" single
 "Open Letter (To a Landlord)" — 5:30
 "Cult of Personality" (Live) — 5:06
 "Talkin' 'Bout a Revolution" — 4:29

Charts

References

1988 songs
1988 singles
Living Colour songs
Protest songs
Songs written by Vernon Reid
Song recordings produced by Ed Stasium
Epic Records singles
1980s ballads
Funk metal songs
Hard rock ballads
Songs about landlords
Songs about letters (message)